Andreas Schmid is an Austrian para-alpine skier. He represented Austria at the 1998 Winter Paralympics and at the 2006 Winter Paralympics.

In 1998 he won the silver medal at the Men's Downhill LW2 event.

Achievements

See also 
 List of Paralympic medalists in alpine skiing

References 

Living people
Year of birth missing (living people)
Place of birth missing (living people)
Paralympic alpine skiers of Austria
Alpine skiers at the 1998 Winter Paralympics
Alpine skiers at the 2006 Winter Paralympics
Medalists at the 1998 Winter Paralympics
Paralympic silver medalists for Austria
Paralympic medalists in alpine skiing